Student No.1 is a 2003 Indian Tamil-language coming of age action film directed by Selva. The film starring Sibiraj in his debut and Sherin in lead role while also features Manivannan, Yugendran and Nassar among others. This movie is a remake of the 2001 Telugu film of the same name. Student Number 1 was panned by critics and flopped at the box office.

Cast

Production
Shooting was commenced at Chennai, for a fifteen-days schedule, after which the unit moved to Russia to shoot two songs. The rest of the songs were shot at locations in Andhra Pradesh. A set at a cost of about two lakhs was erected on the beach in Visakhapatnam and it took six days to picturise a song. Choreographing the dance steps was dance choreographer Tarunraj. Sibiraj said that first scene which was shot on him was "where I enter the college library, and find Sherin and her friends dancing to taped music. I stop the tape and advice the girls".

Soundtrack
The music was composed by Maragatha Mani and released by Pyramid Music. Lyrics were penned by Na. Muthukumar, Kabilan and Annamalai. Except Kadhal Thozhi, all other tunes were retained from the original.

References

2003 films
2000s Tamil-language films
Films shot in Visakhapatnam
Films shot in Andhra Pradesh
Films shot in Russia
Indian romantic drama films
Tamil remakes of Telugu films
Films directed by Selva (director)
2003 romantic drama films